Smidovichsky District is an administrative and municipal district (raion), one of the five in the Jewish Autonomous Oblast, Russia. It is located in the east of the autonomous oblast and borders Khabarovsk Krai (via the Tunguska River) in the north and east, China (via the Amur River) in the south, and Birobidzhansky District in the west. Its administrative center is the urban locality (a settlement) of Smidovich. As of the 2010 Census, the total population of the district was 28,165, with the population of Smidovich accounting for 18.2% of that number.

Geography
The terrain is low river plain, with the Amur and Tunguska Rivers wide and meandering along the district borders. Immediately to the east of the district is the city of Khabarovsk.

The climate is suited to agriculture, supporting buckwheat, corn, wheat, and vegetables.

Transportation
The Trans-Siberian Railway runs across northern length of the district, as does the Amur Highway (R297) from Chita to Khabarovsk.

References

Notes

Sources

Districts of Jewish Autonomous Oblast